Baillet or de Baillet or Baillet von Latour is a former Belgian noble family. The house is divided into different branches, the most famous were the Counts of Baillet-Latour.

History 
The title of Count of Baillet was created by imperial decree of Charles VI, Holy Roman Emperor on 10 March 1719. The first Count of Baillet was Christophe-Ernest. He was the son of Maximilien-Antoine de Baillet. The family had great influence in politics and church, many members were active in the Catholic Party. 

In 1980 the last male heir died without children meaning that the title became extinct.

The family resided in the Chateau de Latour next to Virton until 1794. The Artois-Baillet Latour Foundation is named after the family.

References

 
Lists of Belgian nobility